Abdullah Mousa Mohamed Ahmed Esmaeil Al Bloushi, also called Abdulla Al Bloushi (Arabic: عبد الله موسى; born 23 February 1987 in Al Ain, United Arab Emirates) is an Emirati footballer who plays as a defender .

In 2011 AFC Asian Cup in Qatar, he was called to United Arab Emirates national football team. His national football team was eliminated in the group stage.

Honours
United Arab Emirates
 Gulf Cup of Nations: 2013

References

External links
 
 Goal.com profile

1987 births
Living people
Emirati footballers
United Arab Emirates international footballers
Al Ain FC players
2011 AFC Asian Cup players
UAE Pro League players
Al Jazira Club players
Al-Nasr SC (Dubai) players
Emirati people of Baloch descent
Asian Games medalists in football
Footballers at the 2010 Asian Games
Asian Games silver medalists for the United Arab Emirates
Association football defenders
Medalists at the 2010 Asian Games